Mexicana Universal is a national beauty pageant in Mexico held annually since 2018, replacing the former pageant, Nuestra Belleza México, held since 1994. Currently, the pageant is responsible for selecting the country’s delegates to Miss Universe, Miss International, Reina Hispanoamericana, Miss Charm International, and Nuestra Latinoamericana Universal. The current Mexicana Universal is Irma Miranda of Sonora, who will represent Mexico at Miss Universe 2022.

The organization is directed by the nation's first Miss Universe titleholder, Lupita Jones (1991). Who originally produced the pageant as Nuestra Belleza México in association with the Televisa TV network. In october of 2017, the organization parted ways with Televisa, and found a new home for the pageant's broadcasting in rival network TV Azteca, rebranding the pageant due to televisa still owning the trademark, and changing the format.
 
The organization has produced two Miss Universe winners (2010, 2020), two Miss International winners (2007, 2009), and three Reina Hispanoamericana winners (2008, 2019, 2021).

Contestants
consequently vie in their respective state pageants for eligibility to participate in the national pageant. Contestants are permitted to compete for their sub-national beauty titles more than once. However, this can no longer be done once they have taken part in the national event. They may also choose to represent a different state, as long as they provide proof of having resided in it for at least the last twelve months before registration.

As of the year 2000's edition of the pageant, it is not uncommon for some states to have more than one delegate competing simultaneously. This occurs when non-winning hopefuls from select subdivisions are invited (designated) by the organization to partake in the nationwide competition, taking into consideration their potential, and to possibly make up for other states which may lack representation. Usually three or four are designated annually.

Once in the national concentration, the participants engage in various events and appearances prior to the crucial preliminary competition from which a number of semi-finalists are chosen, only to be announced during the final competition. Additionally, five special awards given through sub-challenges enable the recipients an automatic pass to the semi-finals. During the crowning night, the semi-finalists are evaluated by a panel of judges while vying in swimsuit and evening gown, with eliminations taking place after each of these rounds. The remaining contestants are subsequently interviewed, and the runners-up and winners are respectively announced at the conclusion of the Nuestra Belleza México telecast.

If any of the titleholders is unable to fulfill her duties, the next in turn, known as the suplente (substitute), assumes the right to represent the country abroad. The pageant is held a year prior to when the winners compete internationally, giving them sufficient time to prepare for their corresponding beauty events.

Titleholders
Below are the names of the annual titleholders of Nuestra Belleza México/Mexicana Universal, the states they represented and the venue which played host to their crowning, in ascending order. Titleholders whose names appear highlighted went on to win a major international pageant. For further details, see the representatives at major international pageants section.

Color key

(**)Denisse Franco was awarded with two titles, as the last Nuestra Belleza México 2017 and the first Mexicana Universal 2017

Mexican Miss Universe Winners

Representatives at major international pageants
Below are the names of the delegates enlisted by the Nuestra Belleza Mexico Organization to represent the country at major worldwide beauty contests. Keep in mind that they are listed according to the year in which they participated in their respective international pageants, which do not always coincide with when their national crowning took place, as explained in the last paragraph of the contestants section.

Color key

Miss Universe

Miss World

Miss International

Replaced delegates
The Nuestra Belleza México contestants below were slated to participate in an international pageant, but were unable to go through with it for one reason or another. And thus, they were eventually replaced.

State tally
Below is a table of the top rankings for the Nuestra Belleza Mexico pageant, of the thirty-two Mexican states, based on all results from the first event in 1994 to the most recent competition.

 Cynthia de la Vega was dethroned, decreasing the number of Nuestra Belleza Mundo México titles for Nuevo León by one. The title was passed on to Gabriela Palacio of Aguascalientes.
 Laura Zuñiga was dethroned, decreasing the number of Nuestra Belleza Internacional México titles for Sinaloa by one. The title was passed on to Anagabriela Espinoza of Nuevo León.
 Jacqueline Bracamontes resigned her title after winning the main Nuestra Belleza México crown, decreasing the number of Nuestra Belleza Mundo México titles for Jalisco by one. The title was passed on to Paulina Flores.

Delegates at other pageants

Nuestra Latinoamericana Universal

Miss Orb International

Miss Charm International

Reina Hispanoamericana

 Won Reina Hispanoamericana.

Miss Continente Americano
After the year 2012, the Miss Continente Americano pageant changed its name to Miss United Continent, and the Mexican delegates were sent by another organization. The ones listed below were sent by Nuestra Belleza México.

 Won Miss Continente Americano.

See also
Miss Mexico Organization
El Modelo Mexico
Señorita México
Miss Earth México
Mr Model México

References

External links
Official Website
El Universal Mexicana Universal Website
Miss Mexico: A Brief, Sexy History – slideshow by Life magazine

 
Beauty pageants in Mexico
Mexican culture
Mexico
Mexico
Recurring events established in 1994
1994 establishments in Mexico

fr:Nuestra Belleza México
hu:Miss Mexikó